Greg Boe (born September 8, 1959) is an American politician serving as a member of the Minnesota House of Representatives from the 47B district. First elected in November 2018, he assumed office for this biennium on January 8, 2021.

Early life and education
Boe was born and raised in Wolsey, South Dakota. He earned a Bachelor of Science degree in environmental science and toxicology, with a minor in chemistry, from Minnesota State University, Mankato. He later received a Master of Public Administration from the same university.

Career 
Boe has served as a volunteer and community leader over the years, as a member of the Chaska City Council for 10 years and the city planning commission for nine years before that. He has worked as a department manager for the government of Carver County, Minnesota. and as a major program manager for neighboring Scott County. In addition Boe has also worked in the private-sector, in retail sales and electronic device manufacturing, design, and repair.

Minnesota House of Representatives
Boe was first elected to the Minnesota House of Representatives in 2018. He served on the Environment and Natural Resources Policy Committee, the Energy and Climate Finance and Policy Division, and the Legacy Finance Division during his first term. For the 20221-2022 biennium, Boe's committee assignments include the Climate and Energy Finance and Policy Division, the Legacy Finance Division, and the Education Policy Committee.

Personal life
Boe and his wife, Debbie, have two grown children. He resides in eastern Carver County.

References

External links

 Official House of Representatives website
 Official campaign website

1959 births
Living people
Republican Party members of the Minnesota House of Representatives
21st-century American politicians
Minnesota State University, Mankato alumni